The Ministry of Labour and Social Protection of the Population is a department within the Government of Kazakhstan, which provides leadership and intersectoral coordination in the field of labor, labor safety and labor protection, employment, pension and social security, compulsory social insurance, population migration, social support for needy categories of citizens and families with children, as well as on the appointment and payment of state social benefits for disability, in case of loss of breadwinner and age, special state benefits, state special general allowance for people working in underground and opencast mining, for work with especially harmful and especially difficult working conditions, lump-sum monetary compensation to citizens who suffered as a result of nuclear tests at the Semipalatinsk Test Site and political repressions.

History
The Ministry was created in November 1996 by combining the Ministry of Labour and the Ministry of Social Protection.

The Ministry was abolished in accordance with the Decree 875 by President of Kazakhstan on 6 August 2014 where the functions and powers of the Ministry were transferred to the established Ministry of Health and Social Development.

By the decree of the President of Kazakhstan on 25 January 2017, the Ministry of Health and Social Development was reorganized by separation into the Ministry of Healthcare and the Ministry of Labour and Social Protection which was reestablished.

Structure 
As part of the Ministry:

 Committee of Labor, Social Protection and Migration (Earlier 2 Committees — Committee for Migration and Committee for Control and Social Protection).

Departments:
 Department of Finance;
Department of International Cooperation and Integration;
Department of Development of the National Qualification and Forecasting System;
Department of Analysis and Development of Public Services;
Department of Public Relations;
Department of Strategic Planning and Analysis;
Department of Digitalization;
Department of Internal Audit;
Department of Administrative Work;
Department of Legal Service;
Department of Information Security;  
Department of Managing Personnel Service;
Department of Social Insurance Policy, Basic Social and Pension Provision;  
Department of Social Assistance Policy Development;
Department of Social Services Policy Development;
Department of Labor and Social Partnership;
Department of Employment Population.

List of ministers

References

1996 establishments in Kazakhstan
Labour and Social Protection
Ministries established in 1996